Hasidus may refer to:
 the Hasidic movement in Judaism
 a beetle of the weevil genus in the tribe Madarini, see Hasidus (weevil)